= Geogony =

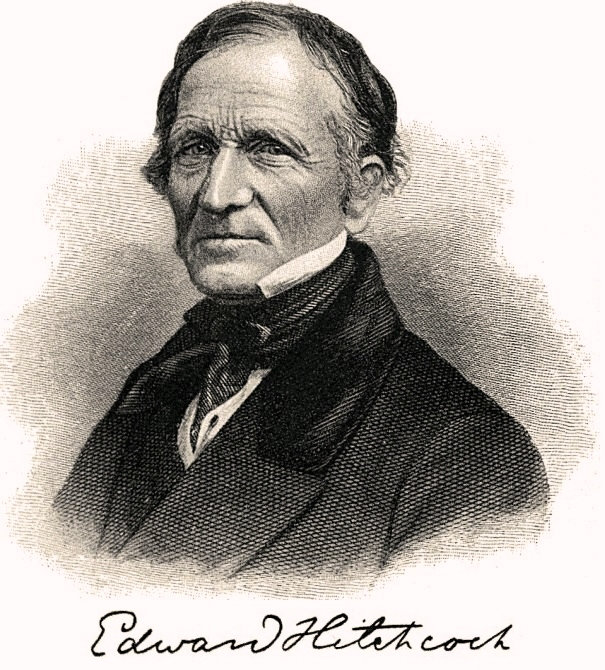
Portrait of Edward Hitchcock, American geologist, paleontologist, and President of Amherst College
